Nikhom Kham Soi is a district (amphoe) of Mukdahan province, northeastern Thailand.

Geography
Neighboring districts are (from the west clockwise) Nong Sung, Mueang Mukdahan and Don Tan of Mukdahan Province, and Loeng Nok Tha of Yasothon province.

History
The minor district (king amphoe) was established on 2 June 1975, when the five tambons Nikhom Kham Soi, Na Kok, Na Udom, Nong Waeng, and Kok Daeng were split off from Mukdahan district. It was upgraded to a full district on 25 March 1979. When Mukdahan Province was created in 1982, Nikhom Kham Soi was one of the districts forming the new province.

Administration 
The district is divided into seven sub-districts (tambons), which are further subdivided into 79 villages (mubans). Nikhom Kham Soi is a township (thesaban tambon) which covers parts of the tambon Nikhom Kham Soi, Na Kok, and Chok Chai. There are a further seven tambon administrative organization (TAO).

References

External links
amphoe.com

Nikhom Kham Soi